Larsa (Sumerian logogram:  UD.UNUGKI, read Larsamki), also referred to as Larancha/Laranchon (Gk. Λαραγχων) by Berossos and connected with the biblical Ellasar, was an important city-state of ancient Sumer, the center of the cult of the sun god Utu.

History

The historical "Larsa" was already in existence as early as the reign of Eannatum of Lagash (reigned circa 2500–2400 BCE), who annexed it to his empire.

The city became a political force during the Isin-Larsa period. After the Third Dynasty of Ur collapsed c. 2000 BC, Ishbi-Erra, an official of the last king of the Third Dynasty of Ur, Ibbi-Sin, relocated to Isin and set up a government which purported to be the successor to the Third Dynasty of Ur. From there, Ishbi-Erra recaptured Ur as well as the cities of Uruk and Lagash, which Larsa was subject to. Subsequent rulers of Isin appointed governors to rule over Larsa; one such governor was an Amorite named Gungunum. He eventually broke with Isin and established an independent dynasty in Larsa. To legitimize his rule and deliver a blow to Isin, Gungunum captured the city of Ur. As the region of Larsa was the main center of trade via the Persian Gulf, Isin lost an enormously profitable trade route, as well as a city with much cultic significance.

Gungunum's two successors, Abisare (c. 1841–1830 BC) and Sumuel (c. 1830–1801 BC), both took steps to cut Isin completely off from access to canals. Isin quickly lost political and economic influence.

Larsa grew powerful, but never accumulated a large territory. At its peak under king Rim-Sin I (c. 1758–1699 BC), Larsa controlled only about 10–15 other city-states — nowhere near the territory controlled by other dynasties in Mesopotamian history.  Nevertheless, huge building projects and agricultural undertakings can be detected archaeologically. After the defeat of Rim-Sin I by Hammurabi of Babylon, Larsa became a minor site, though it has been suggested that it was the home of the First Sealand Dynasty of Babylon. Larsa was known to be active during the Neo-Babylonian period based on building bricks as well as a number of cuneiform texts from the Larsa temple of Samash which were found in Uruk.

Larsa is thought to be the source of a number of tablets involving Babylonian mathematics, including the Plimpton 322 tablet that contains patterns of Pythagorean triples.

Kings of Larsa

Archaeology

The site of Tell es-Senkereh was first excavated, under the rudimentary archaeological standards of his day, by William Loftus in 1850 for less than a month. Loftus recovered building bricks of Nebuchadnezzar II of the Neo-Babylonian Empire which enabled the site's identification as the ancient city of Larsa. Much of the effort by Loftus was on the temple of Shamash, rebuilt by Nebuchadnezzar II. Inscriptions of Burna-Buriash II of the Kassite dynasty of Babylon and Hammurabi of the First Babylonian dynasty were also found. Larsa was also briefly worked by Walter Andrae in 1903. The site was inspected by Edgar James Banks in 1905. He found that widespread looting by the local population was occurring there.

The first modern, scientific, excavation of Senkereh occurred in 1933, with the work of André Parrot.
Parrot worked at the location again in 1967.
In 1969 and 1970, Larsa was excavated by Jean-Claude Margueron.
Between 1976 and 1991, an expedition of the Delegation Archaeologic Francaise en Irak led by J-L. Huot excavated at Tell es-Senereh for 13 seasons. Numerous inscriptions and cuneiform tablets were found representing the reigns of numerous rulers, from Ur-Nammu  to Hammurabi all the way up to Nebuchadnezzar II.

In 2019 excavations were resumed.

See also

Cities of the ancient Near East
Short chronology timeline
Letter from Iddin-Sin to Zinu
Tell Sifr

Notes

References
Judith K. Bjorkman, "The Larsa Goldsmith's Hoards-New Interpretations", Journal of Near Eastern Studies, vol. 52, no. 1, pp. 1–23, 1993
T. Breckwoldt, "Management of grain storage in Old Babylonian Larsa", Archiv für Orientforschung, no. 42-43, pp. 64–88, 1995–1996
Feuerherm, Karljürgen G. “Architectural Features of Larsa’s Urban Dwelling B 27.” Journal of Near Eastern Studies, vol. 66, no. 3, 2007, pp. 193–204
Madeleine Fitzgerald, The Rulers of Larsa, Yale University Dissertation, 2002
Ettalene M. Grice, Clarence E. Keiser, Morris Jastrow, Chronology of the Larsa Dynasty, AMS Press, 1979 
W.F. Leemans, Legal and economic records from the Kingdom of Larsa, Brill, 1954 
Lutz, Henry Frederick. Early Babylonian Letters from Larsa. Vol. 2. Yale University Press, 1917.
Marcel Segrist, Larsa Year Names, Andrews University Press, 1990 
Tyborowski, Witold. “Šēp-Sîn, a Private Businessman of the Old Babylonian Larsa.” Die Welt Des Orients, vol. 33, 2003, pp. 68–88.

External links

After 30-year hiatus, French archaeological mission returns to Iraq – Al-Monitor – Aug 8 2020
Yearnames of Larsa rulers at CDLI
On-line digital images of Larsa Tablets at CDLI

Populated places established in the 3rd millennium BC
States and territories established in the 20th century BC
States and territories disestablished in the 17th century BC
1850 archaeological discoveries
Sumerian cities
Archaeological sites in Iraq
Former populated places in Iraq
Dhi Qar Governorate
Isin-Larsa period
City-states